Albert Kedrick Brown (born March 18, 1981) is an American former professional basketball player and coach. Born and raised in Zachary, Louisiana, Brown played college basketball at Okaloosa-Walton Community College (now Northwest Florida State College), where he was a first team NJCAA All-America selection as a sophomore.

Brown was drafted with the 11th overall pick in the 2001 NBA draft by the Boston Celtics. He was traded to the Cleveland Cavaliers in December 2003 and was later dealt to the Philadelphia 76ers in July 2004.

Professional career

Boston Celtics (2001–2003) 
Brown was drafted 11th overall by the Boston Celtics in the 2001 NBA draft. On October 30, 2001, he made his NBA debut, playing five minutes in a 108–89 win over the Cleveland Cavaliers. On January 21, 2002, Brown scored a season-high 12 points, along with two rebounds and four steals, in a 106–97 win over the Toronto Raptors.

On January 18, 2003, Brown logged season-highs of 14 points and ten rebounds in a 97–95 win over the Milwaukee Bucks.

On November 7, 2003, Brown scored a career-high 18 points, along with six rebounds and two steals, in a 87–94 loss to the New Jersey Nets. On December 13, he played his final game for the Celtics, logging two points and an assist during a 105–98 win over the Cleveland Cavaliers, the team he would be traded to.

Cleveland Cavaliers (2003–2004) 
On December 15, 2003, Brown was traded, along with Eric Williams and Tony Battie, to the Cleveland Cavaliers in exchange for Ricky Davis, Chris Mihm, and Michael Stewart.

Philadelphia 76ers (2004–2005) 
On July 20, 2004, Brown was traded, along with Kevin Ollie, to the Philadelphia 76ers in exchange for Eric Snow. Brown's final NBA game was played on February 4, 2005, in a 103–85 win over the Atlanta Hawks where Kedrick played for 2 and half minutes and scored 1 point.

Anaheim Arsenal (2007–2009) 
Brown was selected ninth overall by the Anaheim Arsenal in the 2007 NBA D-League draft.

Brown was selected 12th overall by the Maine Red Claws in the 2009 NBA D-League expansion draft. However, he never played a game for the team.

Bornova (2009–2010) 
In 2009, Brown joined Bornova for the team's first season in the Turkish Basketball First League (TBL).

Antalya (2011–2012) 
For the final season of his professional basketball career, Brown joined Antalya.

Coaching career 
Brown joined the player personnel of the Southern Jaguars men's basketball team in 2017.

Career statistics

NBA

Regular season

|-
| style="text-align:left;"| 
| style="text-align:left;"| Boston
| 29 || 5 || 8.4 || .329 || .185 || .600 || 1.7 || .5 || .6 || .2 || 2.2
|-
| style="text-align:left;"| 
| style="text-align:left;"| Boston
| 51 || 5 || 13.1 || .357 || .077 || .625 || 2.7 || .4 || .7 || .3 || 2.8
|-
| style="text-align:left;"| 
| style="text-align:left;"| Boston
| 21 || 10 || 19.4 || .455 || .375 || .615 || 3.2 || 1.2 || .8 || .1 || 5.2
|-
| style="text-align:left;"| 
| style="text-align:left;"| Cleveland
| 34 || 16 || 16.5 || .465 || .388 || .643 || 2.3 || 1.1 || .4 || .1 || 5.3
|-
| style="text-align:left;"| 
| style="text-align:left;"| Philadelphia
| 8 || 0 || 6.9 || .333 || .000 || .800 || 1.4 || .5 || .4 || .1 || 1.5
|- class="sortbottom"
| style="text-align:center;" colspan="2"| Career
| 143 || 36 || 13.5 || .405 || .274 || .640 || 2.4 || .7 || .6 || .2 || 3.6

Playoffs

|-
| style="text-align:left;"| 2002
| style="text-align:left;"| Boston
| 2 || 0 || 1.5 || 1.000 || 1.000 || – || .0 || .0 || .0 || .5 || 2.5
|-
| style="text-align:left;"| 2003
| style="text-align:left;"| Boston
| 3 || 0 || 3.7 || .250 || – || .500 || .7 || .0 || .3 || .0 || 1.0
|-
|- class="sortbottom"
| style="text-align:center;" colspan="2"| Career
| 5 || 0 || 2.8 || .500 || 1.000 || .500 || .4 || .0 || .2 || .2 || 1.6

References

External links
basketballreference.com profile

1981 births
Living people
American expatriate basketball people in Turkey
American men's basketball players
Anaheim Arsenal players
Antalya Büyükşehir Belediyesi players
Basketball players from Louisiana
Bornova Belediye players
Boston Celtics draft picks
Boston Celtics players
Cleveland Cavaliers players
Northwest Florida State Raiders men's basketball players
People from Zachary, Louisiana
Philadelphia 76ers players
Small forwards
Zachary High School alumni
Sportspeople from East Baton Rouge Parish, Louisiana